Forced settlement may refer to:

Sedentarization
Forced settlements in the Soviet Union, punitive settlements, a tool of Soviet political repression